Agelena satmila is a species of spider in the family Agelenidae, which contains at least 1,350 species of funnel-web spiders . It was first described by  Tikader, in 1970. It is primarily found in India.

References

satmila
Spiders described in 1970
Spiders of the Indian subcontinent